John Mackay (1656–1754), known as  (The Blind Piper), was a Scottish Gaelic poet and composer, and the grandfather of William Ross.

References

1656 births
1754 deaths
17th-century Scottish Gaelic poets
18th-century Scottish Gaelic poets
Scottish composers
People from Gairloch
People from Ross and Cromarty